The Men's 1500 metres race of the 2015 World Single Distance Speed Skating Championships was held on 13 February 2015.

Results
The race was started at 18:51.

References

Men's 1500 metres